Juicebox may refer to:

 Juicebox (container), a container for holding juice
 Juice Box, a media player from toy manufacturer Mattel
 "Juicebox" (song), a 2005 song by The Strokes
 Juicebox (TV series), a Canadian television series
 Stingray Juicebox, a Canadian television channel
 Juice Box Records, a UK record label from 1992 to 1998
 "The Juice Box", a nickname for Minute Maid Park
 Juice Boxx, Canadian drag queen

See also
 
 
 Jukebox (disambiguation)